Hugh Franklin Finley (January 18, 1833 – October 16, 1909) was a U.S. Representative from Kentucky, father of Charles Finley.

Born at Tyes Ferry, Kentucky, Finley attended the common schools. He engaged in agricultural pursuits, and studied law, gaining admission to the bar in 1859 and commencing practice in Williamsburg, Kentucky. He served as member of the Kentucky House of Representatives from 1861 to August 1862, when he resigned. Finley was elected as a Kentucky Commonwealth's Attorney in 1862, and served until 1866, when he resigned. He was again elected to the position in 1867, and re-elected in 1868 for six more years.

In 1870, he was an unsuccessful candidate for election to the Forty-second Congress. He served in the Kentucky State Senate in 1875 and 1876, when he resigned. He was appointed in 1876 by President Grant as United States Attorney for Kentucky, and served until 1877. He resumed the practice of law. He served as judge of the fifteenth judicial circuit from 1880 to 1886.

Finley was elected as a Republican to the Fiftieth and Fifty-first Congresses (March 4, 1887 – March 3, 1891). He was an unsuccessful candidate for renomination in 1890. He resumed the practice of law and also engaged in the coal mining business.

He died in Williamsburg, Kentucky at the age of 73, and was interred in Woodlawn Cemetery.

References

1833 births
1909 deaths
Republican Party members of the Kentucky House of Representatives
Kentucky Commonwealth's Attorneys
Republican Party Kentucky state senators
Kentucky state court judges
Republican Party members of the United States House of Representatives from Kentucky
19th-century American politicians
19th-century American judges